Brian Fatih (born October 18, 1972 in Atlanta, Georgia) is an American Olympic sailor in the Star class. He competed in the 2012 Summer Olympics together with Mark Mendelblatt, where they finished 7th.

References

Olympic sailors of the United States
American male sailors (sport)
Star class sailors
Sailors at the 2012 Summer Olympics – Star
1972 births
Living people
Sportspeople from Atlanta